Lake Ridge is the name of a city in Virginia and a neighborhood in Dallas County, Texas.
Lake Ridge, Virginia
Lake Ridge, Dallas County, Texas